Bedford is a home rule-class city in Trimble County, Kentucky, United States. The population was 574 at the 2020 Census. It is the second largest city and county seat of Trimble County.

It is located at the junction of U.S. Routes 42 and 421.

History
Bedford was founded in 1816 and first incorporated in 1999. Following its loss of city status, it was reincorporated in 1946. The Coleman House is listed on the National Register of Historic Places.

Geography

Demographics

At the 2000 census there were 677 people in 282 households, including 183 families, in the city. The racial makeup of the city was 97.93% White, 0.15% African American, 1.77% from other races, and 0.15% from two or more races. Hispanic or Latino of any race were 2.36%.

Of the 282 households 35.8% had children under the age of 18 living with them, 40.4% were married couples living together, 20.6% had a female householder with no husband present, and 35.1% were non-families. 28.7% of households were one person and 13.8% were one person aged 65 or older. The average household size was 2.40 and the average family size was 2.96.

The age distribution was 28.5% under the age of 18, 10.2% from 18 to 24, 30.9% from 25 to 44, 17.3% from 45 to 64, and 13.1% 65 or older. The median age was 32 years. For every 100 females, there were 89.6 males. For every 100 females age 18 and over, there were 74.1 males.

The median household income was $31,528 and the median family income  was $36,250. Males had a median income of $30,341 versus $22,188 for females. The per capita income for the city was $14,818. About 12.9% of families and 15.5% of the population were below the poverty line, including 19.3% of those under age 18 and 7.1% of those age 65 or over.

Education
Trimble County's sole high school, Trimble County High School, is located within Bedford. The city is also home to Bedford Elementary School.

Bedford has a public library, the Trimble County Public Library.

Notable people
 Eva Anne Madden (1863–1958), American educator, journalist, playwright, author

References

Cities in Kentucky
Cities in Trimble County, Kentucky
County seats in Kentucky
Louisville metropolitan area